A women's One Day International (WODI) is an international cricket match between two teams, each having WODI status, as determined by the International Cricket Council (ICC). In a WODI match, the two teams play a single innings, each of which is restricted to a maximum of fifty overs. The first WODI matches were played as part of the Women's Cricket World Cup in 1973 held in England, two years after the first men's One Day International was contested between Australia and England in January 1971. A century is a score of one hundred or more runs by a batsman in a single innings. This is regarded as a notable achievement. , 256 centuries have been scored by 97 different players from 1,302 WODI matches.

The first two centuries in WODIs were scored as part of the opening round in the 1973 Women's World Cup. England's Lynne Thomas and Enid Bakewell both achieved the feat as part of their team's victory over the International XI. Thomas and Bakewell are two of only seven players to score a century during their WODI debut, the others being Nicole Bolton of Australia, India's Reshma Gandhi and Mithali Raj, Natthakan Chantam of Thailand and Zimbabwe's Mary-Anne Musonda; Thomas, Bakewell, Chantam and Musonda's centuries all came in their teams' maiden WODIs. Raj and Gandhi centuries came in a match against Ireland in 1999 which saw Raj become the then youngest player to score a century, aged 16 years 205 days. This record stood for 22 years before it was broken by Ireland's Amy Hunter who scored hers on her 16th birthday against Zimbabwe in 2021. Raj and Gandhi's centuries are one of thirty-four occurrences where two or more centuries have been scored in a WODI. The oldest player to score a WODI century is New Zealand's Barbara Bevege who was aged 39 years and 48 days when she reached 101 against the International XI during the 1982 Women's World Cup.

The most recent century, was scored by Natthakan Chantam of Thailand against the Netherlands at the Royal Chiangmai Golf Club in Mae Faek, in November 2022. Meg Lanning of Australia holds the record for the most centuries, having scored 15. She is followed by Suzie Bates, the former skipper of New Zealand, with twelve centuries and Charlotte Edwards of England, with nine. New Zealand's Amelia Kerr holds the record for the highest individual score in a WODI with 232 not out scored against Ireland in June 2018, eclipsing Belinda Clark's of Australia longstanding record of 229 not out scored against Denmark in 1997, becoming the youngest cricketer, male or female, to score a double century in One Day International cricket. As this was Kerr's first time reaching the milestone, the innings was also the highest maiden WODI century scored breaking Deepti Sharma of India's mark of 188 against Ireland during the 2017 South Africa Women's Quadrangular Series. Amy Satterthwaite of New Zealand has scored four consecutive WODI centuries, the sole player to do so. Twenty-six centuries have been scored by a player in a losing side, the highest score being 178 not out by Sri Lanka's Chamari Atapattu whose team lost to Australia during the 2017 Women's World Cup. A further four centuries have been scored in matches that have ended in a no result.

Australia and England lead the list with 63 centuries, followed by New Zealand with 47. Bert Sutcliffe Oval in Lincoln, New Zealand, leads the list of where the most centuries have been scored with fourteen, ahead of the Bristol County Ground with eight, and then the Bay Oval, Seddon Park and Senwes Park with seven each.

Key

Centuries

Notes

References

!
One Day International cricket records
Women ODI